Chris Cantwell may refer to:

 Christian Cantwell (born 1980), American shot putter
 Christopher Cantwell (filmmaker), writer, producer, and director in film and comics; co-creator of the TV series Halt and Catch Fire
Christopher Cantwell (born 1980), white supremacist